Thebaid may refer to:
The Thebaid (Latin poem) or Thebais, an epic poem by Statius, chronicling the story of the war between the brothers Eteocles and Polynices
The Thebaid (Greek poem) or Thebais, an epic poem, part of the Theban Cycle, sometimes attributed to Homer, also chronicling the story of the war between Eteocles and Polynices
The Thebaid or Thebais, an epic poem by Antimachus
La Thébaïde, a tragedy by French writer Jean Racine
The Thebaid or Thebais, a region of ancient Egypt containing the thirteen southernmost nomes of Upper Egypt
The Thebais (Greece) or Thebaid, a region of ancient Boeotia, Greece, containing the city of Thebes
The Thebaid (painting), a painting by Paolo Uccello